Oluwunmi Mosaku  (born 1986) is a Nigerian-born British actress. She is known for her roles as Joy in the BBC Two miniseries Moses Jones (2009) and Holly Lawson in the ITV series Vera (2011–2012). She won the BAFTA TV Award for Best Supporting Actress for her role as Gloria Taylor in the TV film Damilola, Our Loved Boy (2016). In 2019, she starred in the fifth series of Luther. In 2020, she starred as Ruby Baptiste in HBO's Lovecraft Country, and starting in 2021, starred as Hunter B-15 in the Marvel Cinematic Universe (MCU) television series Loki.

She was nominated for the BAFTA for Best Actress and won the BIFA Award for Best Performance by an Actress in a British Independent Film for her role as Rial in the film His House (2020).

Early life
Mosaku was born in Nigeria, and subsequently emigrated to Manchester, England, when she was one year old. She attended Trinity Church of England High School and Xaverian Sixth Form College. She also sang for eleven years in the Manchester Girls Choir. Her parents were both professors in Nigeria but were unable to do the same jobs in the UK. Her mother started a business and her father ended up returning to Nigeria.

Career
Mosaku graduated from the Royal Academy of Dramatic Art in 2007 and made her stage debut at the Arcola Theatre in a production of Pedro Calderón de la Barca's The Great Theatre of the World. Since then she has also appeared in Rough Crossings, directed by Rupert Goold and based on the book by Simon Schama, at the Lyric Hammersmith; The Vertical Hour by David Hare and Truth and Reconciliation, both at the Royal Court Theatre; and Mules at the Young Vic. In 2009, she appeared in Katrina, a verbatim play which told six people's stories of their struggles of survival when Hurricane Katrina devastated New Orleans August 2005. Mosaku was originally cast as Sophie in the UK premiere of Ruined by Lynn Nottage at the Almeida Theatre but had to pull out due to an injury.

In 2008, she appeared in the first of the UNDEREXPOSED exhibitions at the National Portrait Gallery, designed to raise the profile of black role models and celebrates the talent that exists among the Black British community. Her photo also appeared on Commercial Way, Peckham, London, as part of the exhibition. In 2009, she starred in the BBC Two series Moses Jones, for which she won Best Actress in a Miniseries at the Roma Fiction Festival.

She featured on the front cover of Screen International magazine June–July 2009 as one of the UK Stars of Tomorrow, and in 2011 was featured in Nylon Magazines 2011 Young Hollywood issue.

In 2010, Wunmi Mosaku was named one of The Seven Fresh Faces of Toronto International Film Festival, for I Am Slave, in which she starred. She plays Malia, a girl who has been kidnapped from her village in Sudan, and sold into slavery. For her performance Mosaku won awards such as Best Actress at the Birmingham Black Film Festival, Best Onscreen performance at the Cultural Diversity Awards and Best Female performance at the Screen Nation Awards. In 2011, Mosaku joined the cast of Vera, playing the role of Holly Lawson, but left the show after just one year.

In 2015, Mosaku played the part of Quentina, a traffic warden, in the three-part BBC series Capital based on John Lanchester's novel of the same name. In 2016, she appeared in Playtest, an episode of the anthology series Black Mirror.

Mosaku won the 2017 BAFTA TV Award for Best Supporting Actress for playing Gloria Taylor in the TV film Damilola, Our Loved Boy.

Personal life
When asked to list her personal heroes, Mosaku included her grandmother Anike Adisa, whom she described as having "taught me so many lessons"; actor Albert Finney, who was her inspiration for attending the Royal Academy of Dramatic Art; her colleague and former instructor at RADA, William Gaskill; Paul Newman, whom she admired, not just for his acting, but also for his philanthropic efforts with Newman's Own; and Oprah Winfrey, who Mosaku considers "a superwoman".

Filmography

Film

Television

Radio
Drama on 3: The Vertical Hour (2008) on BBC Radio 3, as Terri Scholes
Drama on 4: Normal and Nat (2009) on BBC Radio 4, as Shanice
Drama on 4: Amazing Grace (2010) on BBC Radio 4, as Grace

Awards and nominations

References

External links
Wunmi Mosaku at RADA

1986 births
Living people
Actresses from Manchester
Alumni of RADA
Best Supporting Actress BAFTA Award (television) winners
Black British actresses
English film actresses
English people of Yoruba descent
English radio actresses
English stage actresses
English television actresses
People from Chorlton-cum-Hardy
People from Zaria
Nigerian emigrants to the United Kingdom
Yoruba actresses
21st-century English actresses
21st-century Nigerian actresses
English people of Nigerian descent